AMFJ is a power noise musician from Reykjavík, Iceland. The outfit has one member, Aðalsteinn Jörundsson, whose initials are the basis of the project name. He debuted on the electronic/noise scene with a performance at Reykjavík's Organ bar on 30 July 2008, performing alongside Krakkbot, Auxpan and Oberdada von Brutal. Since then AMFJ has performed at many of the venues comprising the Reykjavík music scene. A typical AMFJ show is filled with feedback loops, mixed with loud, beat oriented playbacks and heavily sound-altered vocals. In addition to regular performances, AMFJ has appeared at the first annual Réttir music festival in Reykjavík  and performed an off-venue gig at Eistnaflug 2009, a long running metal festival that runs every July in Neskaupstaður, in eastern Iceland.

AMFJ's inaugural cassette, Itemhljóð & Veinan, has been released on FALK, an artist run label/art society, in May 2009. The offering has received media attention for its medium, the oft considered obsolete cassette tape. Adding to the oddity of the release is the extensive hexadecimal labelling system used to document the manufactured cassettes. Several of the cassettes feature hidden tracks (another oddity for a cassette) that were created and mixed by AMFJ spontaneously during the manufacturing process.

Itemhljóð & Veinan has received positive feedback, with one review in the Reykjavík Grapevine saying: "There's a point where art-music becomes almost transcendentally self-indulgent and that is the point at which it also becomes magnificent."

References

External links 

 https://web.archive.org/web/20081219070035/http://www.gogoyoko.com/#/artist/amfj#/artist/amfj

Icelandic musicians
Musicians from Reykjavík
Icelandic artists
Living people
Year of birth missing (living people)